"Until I Get You" is a single by the Finnish rock and glam punk band Hanoi Rocks. The band's guitarist and primary songwriter Andy McCoy wrote this song at the band's manager Seppo Vesterinen's house in Helsinki. McCoy hated the song but the band's drummer Razzle loved it, and wanted it on their next record. Ultimately McCoy also fell in love with the song. The song is a kind of ballad that explains Hanoi Rocks' own melodic style very well. Also, the arrangement for the song was inspired by Alice Cooper's "I'm Eighteen".

American band L.A. Guns covered the song on their album Rips the Covers Off in 2004.

Track listing

Personnel
Michael Monroe - Lead vocals
Andy McCoy - Lead guitar
Nasty Suicide - Rhythm guitar
Sam Yaffa - Bass
Razzle - Drums
Gyp Casino - Drums on "Tragedy" and "Oriental Beat"
Morgan Fisher - Keyboards on "Until I Get You"
Miriam Stockley - Backing vocals on "Until I Get You"

Hanoi Rocks songs
1983 songs
Songs written by Andy McCoy